Plagiobothrys is a genus of flowering plants known commonly as popcorn flowers. These are small herbaceous plants which bear tiny white or yellow flowers. Their fruits are nutlets. Although these plants are found predominantly in North America and South America, five species are known from Australia. Of the approximately 65 species described, more than 15 are endemic to California.

Description 
The inflorescence is coiled in bud,  but generally elongates in fruit. The pedicels  are generally 0–1 mm, and the flower is bisexual with the sepals fused below the middle.

Etymology 
The genus name, Plagiobothrys, is derived from Greek to mean "sideways pit" and describes the position of nutlet attachment scar.

Selected species 
Plagiobothrys acanthocarpus - adobe popcornflower
Plagiobothrys arizonicus - Arizona popcornflower
Plagiobothrys austiniae - Austin's popcornflower
Plagiobothrys bracteatus - bracted popcornflower
Plagiobothrys canescens - valley popcornflower
Plagiobothrys chorisianus - artist's popcornflower
Plagiobothrys collinus - Cooper's popcornflower
Plagiobothrys diffusus - San Francisco popcornflower
Plagiobothrys distantiflorus - California popcornflower
Plagiobothrys figuratus - fragrant popcornflower
Plagiobothrys fulvus - fulvous popcornflower
Plagiobothrys glyptocarpus - sculptured popcornflower
Plagiobothrys greenei - Greene's popcornflower
Plagiobothrys hirtus - rough popcornflower
Plagiobothrys hispidus - Cascade popcornflower
Plagiobothrys humistratus - dwarf popcornflower
Plagiobothrys infectivus - dye popcornflower
Plagiobothrys jonesii - Mojave popcornflower
Plagiobothrys kingii - Great Basin popcornflower
Plagiobothrys leptocladus - finebranched popcornflower
Plagiobothrys mollis - soft popcornflower
Plagiobothrys nothofulvus - rusty popcornflower
Plagiobothrys parishii - Parish's popcornflower
Plagiobothrys plurisepaleus
Plagiobothrys scouleri - Scouler's popcornflower
Plagiobothrys shastensis - Shasta popcornflower
Plagiobothrys stipitatus - stalked popcornflower
Plagiobothrys strictus - Calistoga popcornflower
Plagiobothrys tenellus - Pacific popcornflower
Plagiobothrys uncinatus - Salinas Valley popcornflower

References

External links
Jepson Manual Treatment

 
Flora of North America
Boraginaceae genera